Cyperus impubes is a species of sedge that is native to eastern Africa and islands in the western parts of the Indian Ocean.

The species was first formally described by the botanist Ernst Gottlieb von Steudel in 1854.

See also
 List of Cyperus species

References

impubes
Plants described in 1854
Taxa named by Ernst Gottlieb von Steudel
Flora of Ethiopia
Flora of Eritrea
Flora of Kenya
Flora of Madagascar
Flora of Mauritius
Flora of Somalia
Flora of Sudan
Flora of Tanzania
Flora of Uganda